Calaveras de Arriba is a locality located in the municipality of Almanza, in León province, Castile and León, Spain. As of 2020, it has a population of 24.

Geography 
Calaveras de Arriba is located 68km east-northeast of León, Spain.

References

Populated places in the Province of León